is a Japanese hurdler. He is the 2016 Asian junior champion in the 400 metres hurdles and has a personal best of 49.43 seconds. He also holds the Asian best performance of 22.55 seconds in the 200 metres hurdles. His time equaled world best performance in the event, but his time was not ratified.

Personal bests

International competition

National titles

References

External links

Yoshiro Watanabe at Niigata Albirx Running Club 

1997 births
Living people
Josai University alumni
Japanese male hurdlers
Sportspeople from Fukushima Prefecture